Abdi Banda (born 20 May 1995) is a Tanzanian international footballer who plays for Chippa United as a defender.

Club career
Born in Tanga, he has played club football for Coastal Union, Simba, Baroka and Highlands Park. In September 2021 he signed for Mtibwa Sugar.

In June 2022 he signed for Chippa United.

International career
He made his international debut for Tanzania in 2014.

Personal life
He has a daughter, born October 2019, with his wife Zabibu Kiba, the sister of Ali Kiba. The child was initially reported to be a boy.

References

1995 births
Living people
People from Tanga, Tanzania
Tanzanian footballers
Tanzania international footballers
Coastal Union F.C. players
Simba S.C. players
Baroka F.C. players
Highlands Park F.C. players
Mtibwa Sugar F.C. players
Chippa United F.C. players
Tanzanian Premier League players
South African Premier Division players
Association football defenders
Tanzanian expatriate footballers
Tanzanian expatriate sportspeople in South Africa
Expatriate soccer players in South Africa